In taxonomy, Ruegeria is a genus of the Rhodobacteraceae. This genus was formerly known as the marine Agrobacterium before they were reclassified in 1998. It bears in fact the name of Hans-Jürgen Rüger, a German microbiologist, for his contribution to the taxonomy of marine species of Agrobacterium.

Characteristics
The genus is characterised by members who are:
 Gram-negative (like all Proteobacteria)
 ovoid to rod-shaped cells 0.6–1.6 × 1.0–4.0 µm
 motile by polar flagella, or nonmotile
 non-sporeformers
 aerobic
 oxidase and catalase positive
 are incapable of photosynthetic growth
 bacteriochlorophyll a is absent
 major quinone is ubiquinone 10
 mol% G+C of the DNA is 55–59
 member of the family Rhodobacteraceae, which is phenotypically, metabolically, ecologically diverse and defined based on 16S sequences data

Phylogenetically it is very close to the genus Silicibacter, but the two remain separate species due to phenotypic differences — two species for which this is problematic are Ruegeria lacuscaerulensis and Ruegeria pomeroyi.

Two species that have been removed from the genus are Marinovum algicola (Ruegeria algicola) and Thalassobius gelatinovorus (Ruegeria gelatinovora).[and refs therein]

Small non-coding RNAs 
Highly abundant  bacterial small RNAs have been shown to be present in the bacteria subjected to chronic nutrient limitation. In Ruegeria pomeroyi  RNAseq analysis identified 99 putative sRNAs.  The bacterial sRNAs regulatory mechanisms are typically based on direct RNA-RNA interaction  with a target mRNA. The target gene groups identified by Rivers et al. were  genes involved in transport, genes mediating cell-cell interactions, signal transduction and transcriptional regulation.

References

Further reading

Scientific journals

Scientific books

Scientific databases

External links

Rhodobacteraceae
Bacteria genera